Koročun or Kračun (see other variants below) is one of the names of Slavic pagan holiday Koliada. In modern usage, it may refer to the winter solstice in certain Eastern European languages, and also to the holiday of Christmas.

Names and etymology
 
Belarusian: Карачун, Karačun;
, Kračon or Крачунек, Kračunek
;
, Kračun;
Old Russian: , Koročunŭ;
, Koročun or Карачун, Karačun;

Ruthenian: К(е)речун, K(e)rečun or Ґ(е)речун, G(e)rečun;
, Kračun;
;
;
.

Max Vasmer derived the name of the holiday from the Proto-Slavic *korčunŭ, which is in turn derived from the verb *korčati, meaning to step forward. Gustav Weigand,  and Alexandru Philippide offer a similar Slavic etymology, based on kratŭkŭ (curt, short) or kračati (to make steps). On the other hand, Hugo Schuchardt, Vatroslav Jagić, and  proposed a Romanian origin of the word, as does also the Romanian Etymological Dictionary, tracing its roots back to the Latin creatio,-nis. However, most probably the Romanian word, as well as the Hungarian, are loanwords with Slavic roots.

Religious and mythological significance
Koročun or Kračun was a pagan Slavic holiday. It was considered the day when the Black God and other spirits associated with decay and darkness were most potent. The first recorded usage of the term was in 1143, when the author of the Novgorod First Chronicle referred to the winter solstice as "Koročun".

It was celebrated by pagan Slavs on December 21, the longest night of the year and the night of the winter solstice. On this night, Hors, symbolizing old sun, becomes smaller as the days become shorter in the Northern Hemisphere, and dies on December 22, the winter solstice. It is said to be defeated by the dark and evil powers of the Black God. On December 23, Hors is resurrected and becomes the new sun, Koleda.

Modern scholars tend to associate this holiday with ancestor worship. On this day, Western Slavs lit fires at cemeteries to keep their loved ones warm, and organized feasts to honor the dead and keep them fed. They also lit wooden logs at local crossroads. In some Slavic languages, the word came to denote unexpected death of a young person and the evil spirit that shortens life.

See also 

 Crăciun (disambiguation)

References

Slavic mythology
December observances
Observances honoring the dead